Earle Cabell (October 27, 1906 – September 24, 1975) was a Texas politician who served as mayor of Dallas, Texas. Cabell was mayor at the time of the assassination of United States President John F. Kennedy and was later a member of the U.S. House of Representatives.

Early life
Cabell was born in Dallas. He graduated from North Dallas High School in 1925. He attended Texas A&M University for one term, where he met Jack Crichton and H.R. "Bum" Bright, and thereafter Southern Methodist University for one term.

He and his brothers founded Cabell's Inc., a chain of dairies and convenience stores. He later became involved with banking and other investments. In April 1961, he was elected mayor to succeed Robert L. Thornton.

Family
Cabell was the youngest of four sons of the then former Dallas Mayor Ben E. Cabell and also the grandson of the former Dallas Mayor William L. Cabell. He was the brother of Charles Cabell, who was deputy director of the Central Intelligence Agency until Charles was fired in the wake of the Bay of Pigs invasion.

Assassination of Kennedy
Cabell and his wife met United States President John F. Kennedy and Mrs. Kennedy at Love Field on the morning of November 22, 1963. Cabell's wife reported that while riding in Kennedy's motorcade through Dealey Plaza, she observed "a rather long looking thing" sticking out of a window of the Texas School Book Depository immediately after the first shot. After receiving word from the Federal Bureau of Investigation that he was the subject of a death threat, Cabell was guarded by police when he traveled to Washington, D.C. to attend Kennedy's funeral and also upon his return to Dallas.

One version of John F. Kennedy assassination conspiracy theories, the "Renegade CIA Clique" theory, implicates Cabell and other alleged conspirators, including CIA officials James Jesus Angleton, William King Harvey, and Cabell's brother Charles Cabell. This theory claims Earl Cabell re-routed Kennedy's motorcade as a favor to his brother.

Congress
On February 3, 1964, Cabell resigned as mayor of Dallas in order to run for Congress.  He unseated the ten-year Republican incumbent Bruce Alger. In that same election, Jack Crichton was defeated by a wide margin by the Democratic Texas Governor John B. Connally, Jr., and George Herbert Walker Bush fell to United States Senator Ralph W. Yarborough. Cabell served four terms in the House before he was defeated by the Republican Alan Steelman in the 1972 election. Cabell voted in favor of the Voting Rights Act of 1965 and the Civil Rights Act of 1968.

Later life
Following his defeat, he retired in Dallas, where he lived until his death in 1975 from emphysema. He was buried at Restland Cemetery in Dallas.

Legacy
The Earle Cabell Federal Building and Courthouse on Commerce Street in Dallas is named in his honor.

References

External links

1906 births
1975 deaths
20th-century American politicians
American businesspeople in retailing
Deaths from emphysema
Democratic Party members of the United States House of Representatives from Texas
Mayors of Dallas
Texas A&M University alumni
Witnesses to the assassination of John F. Kennedy